Diệp Hoài Xuân, also known in Cambodia as Ream Serng (born 9 November 1992) is a Cambodian-Vietnamese footballer who plays as a centre back.

Personal life
Diệp Hoài Xuân was born to a poor Khmer Krom family in Cà Mau Province. A tall and gifted footballer he joined the local youth team of Ca Mau. He has dual Cambodian-Vietnamese citizenship. As for the result, he is eligible to represent either Cambodia and Vietnam.

Club career
Hoài Xuân initially had aspirations to join Dong Thap FC, but after he was told he didn't have any opportunity there he spent the next three years playing for lower club sides in the second and third division. In 2015, he joined Kirivong Sok Sen Chey and played a crucial role in the team's season, and was awarded Cambodian citizenship as a result, even though they did finish last in the 2015 Cambodian League. In 2016, he finally joined Dong Thap FC and started playing in top flight football in Vietnam.

At the end of the 2016 season Dong Thap finished bottom of the league and were relegated. However on 21 September 2016, just three days after the last match, runners up Hải Phòng revealed that they had been tracking Hoài Xuân's progress for some time and agreed to sign him.

Playing style
Hoài Xuân is known as a versatile player, he initially started out as a goalkeeper while he was playing in the youth club, and then became a forward as he played in the lower divisions and Cambodian league. He now plays as a central defender for Dong Thap FC.

References 

1992 births
Living people
Cambodian footballers
Vietnamese footballers
Association football central defenders
Association football forwards
Association football utility players
Dong Thap FC players
Haiphong FC players
V.League 1 players
Khmer Krom people
People from Cà Mau Province
Vietnamese expatriate footballers
Vietnamese expatriate sportspeople in Cambodia
Expatriate footballers in Vietnam
Expatriate footballers in Cambodia
Phnom Penh Crown FC players
Nagaworld FC players